Nils Arvid Ramm (1 January 1903 – 8 November 1986) was a Swedish heavyweight boxer who won a silver medal at the 1928 Summer Olympics. Previously he won the 1927 European title and finished second in 1925. After the Olympics Ramm turned professional and had a record of 17 wins, 4 losses and one draw before retiring in 1931.

1928 Olympic Results
Below are the results of Nils Ramm, a Swedish heavyweight boxer who competed at the 1928 Amsterdam Olympics:

 Round of 16: bye
 Quarterfinal: defeated Hans Schonrath (Germany) on points
 Semifinal: defeated Sverre Sorsdal (Norway) on points
 Final: lost to Arturo Rodriguez (Argentina) by first-round knockout (was awarded silver medal)

References

1903 births
1986 deaths
Heavyweight boxers
Olympic boxers of Sweden
Boxers at the 1928 Summer Olympics
Olympic silver medalists for Sweden
Olympic medalists in boxing
Swedish male boxers
Medalists at the 1928 Summer Olympics
Sportspeople from Stockholm
20th-century Swedish people
Djurgårdens IF boxers